Cyperus ramosus is a species of sedge that is native to northern parts of Australia.

See also 
 List of Cyperus species

References 

ramosus
Plants described in 1936
Flora of Queensland
Flora of the Northern Territory
Taxa named by Georg Kükenthal